The Journal of Clinical Investigation is a twice-monthly peer-reviewed medical journal covering biomedical research. It was established in 1924 and is published by the American Society for Clinical Investigation. Articles focus on the mechanisms of disease, with an emphasis on basic research, early-stage clinical studies in humans, and new research tools and techniques. The journal also publishes reviews in edited series or as stand-alone articles, commentaries on research, editorials, and feature items. The editor-in-chief is Elizabeth M. McNally (Northwestern University).

Abstracting and indexing
The journal is abstracted and indexed in:

Editors-in-chief
The following persons have been editor-in-chief of the journal:

Most cited articles
The following articles have received the most citations , according to Scopus:
 (6051 citations)
 (5476 citations)
 (4971 citations)

References

External links

General medical journals
English-language journals
Publications established in 1924
Academic journals published by learned and professional societies
Hybrid open access journals